Oupa Ephraim Monareng is a South African politician, a  member of the African National Congress and was a member of the National Assembly from 2004 to 2009. He is on the Johannesburg Mayoral Committee with a portfolio for Economic Development.

References

Year of birth missing (living people)
Living people
Members of the National Assembly of South Africa
African National Congress politicians